Ahn Yong-joon (born November 22, 1987) is a South Korean actor.

Filmography

Television series
 Under the Queen's Umbrella (2022); Cameo (episode 12)  
 Secret House (2022) 
 Tunnel (2017)
 Make Your Wish (MBC, 2014)
 Two Weeks (2013)
 Jeon Woo-chi (2012)
 Full House Take 2 (2012)
 Monster (2012)
 Quiz of God Season 2 (2011)
 Drama Special "Our Happy Days of Youth" (2011) (cameo)
 Can't Lose (2011) (guest appearance, ep 12-13)
 Drama Special "Hair Show" (2011)
 Quiz of God (2010) (guest appearance, ep 9-10)
 Comrades (2010)
 Gourmet (2008)
 I Am Happy (2008)
 MBC Best Theater "봉재 돌아오다" (2007)
 Get Karl! Oh Soo-jung (2007)
 Capital Scandal (2007)
 90 Days, Time to Love (2006)
 Secret Campus (2006)
 My Love (2006)
 My Lovely Fool (2006)
 Jumong (2006)
 Sharp 3 (2006)
 Love and Ambition (2006)

Film
 Half (2014)
 School of Youth: The Corruption of Morals (2014)
 How to Use Guys with Secret Tips (2013)
 Almost Che (2012)
 Officer of the Year (2011)
 Lifting King Kong (2009)
 First Love (2008)

Music video
10cm - "Love is Falling in Drops" (2012)
Huh Gak - "It Hurts" (2012)
Huh Gak - "The Person Who Once Loved Me" (2012)
Acoustic Collabo - "You and Me, Heart Fluttering" (2011)
2NB - "Because I'm a Girl" (2007)

References

External links
  
 Ahn Yong-joon Fan Cafe at Daum 
 
 

South Korean male film actors
South Korean male television actors
1987 births
Living people